An English-based creole language (often shortened to English creole) is a creole language for which English was the lexifier, meaning that at the time of its formation the vocabulary of English served as the basis for the majority of the creole's lexicon. Most English creoles were formed in British colonies, following the great expansion of British naval military power and trade in the 17th, 18th and 19th centuries. The main categories of English-based creoles are Atlantic (the Americas and Africa) and Pacific (Asia and Oceania).

Over 76.5 million people estimated globally speak some form of English-based creole. Sierra Leone, Malaysia, Nigeria, Ghana, Jamaica, and Singapore have the largest concentrations of creole speakers.

Origin
It is disputed to what extent the various English-based creoles of the world share a common origin. The monogenesis hypothesis posits that a single language, commonly called proto–Pidgin English, spoken along the West African coast in the early sixteenth century, was ancestral to most or all of the Atlantic creoles (the English creoles of both West Africa and the Americas).

Table of creole languages

Marginal
Bonin English, sometimes considered a mixed language
Iyaric ("Rastafarian")
Jamaican Maroon Spirit Possession Language

Other
Not strictly creoles, but sometimes called thus:
 Bay Islands English
 Cayman Islands English

See also
List of English-based pidgins
Middle English creole hypothesis
World Englishes
Belter Creole

Notes

References

Further reading

External links
 Atlas of Pidgin and Creole Language Structures